Brezova may refer to:

 Březová (disambiguation), several towns and villages in the Czech Republic
 Brezova, Celje, a village in the Municipality of Celje, eastern Slovenia
 Brezova, Croatia, a village in Croatia
 Brezova, Ivanjica, a village in Serbia
 Brezova (Kraljevo), a village in Serbia